The McDonnell TD2D Katydid was a pulsejet-powered American target drone produced by McDonnell Aircraft that entered service with the United States Navy in 1942, and continued in use until the late 1940s.

History
In March 1941, the U. S. Navy awarded McDonnell Aircraft a contract for a radio-controlled target drone under the designation of XTD2D-1 for anti-aircraft and aerial gunnery practice. The aircraft had a mid-mounted wing, V-tail, and McDonnell XPJ40-MD-2 pulsejet engine mounted atop the rear fuselage. The drone could be either launched by catapult from the ground or from underwing racks on Consolidated PBY Catalina flying boats. It was gyro-stabilized, and control was by radio command; at the end of its mission the drone could be recovered by parachute.

Operational history
The Katydid entered service in 1942; testing took place at the Naval Air Missile Test Center in Point Mugu, California. Production models were originally designated TD2D-1, however the Navy changed its designation system in 1946 and the XTD2D-1 and TD2D-1 were redesignated as XKDD-1 and KDD-1, respectively. Later that year, the Navy changed McDonnell's manufacturer code letter from "D" - which had been shared with Douglas Aircraft - to "H", the KDD-1 being again redesignated, as KDH-1.

Surviving aircraft
A KDH-1 is displayed in the Steven F. Udvar-Hazy Center of the National Air and Space Museum, having been donated by the U.S. Navy in 1966.

Specifications (KDD-1)

See also

References

TD2D Katydid
1940s United States special-purpose aircraft
Target drones of the United States
V-tail aircraft
Pulsejet-powered aircraft
Single-engined jet aircraft
Mid-wing aircraft
World War II jet aircraft of the United States
Aircraft first flown in 1942